Anton Besold (January 13, 1904  in Weßling - September 20, 1991 in Oberhaching) was a German politician. He was a representative of the Bavaria Party and Christian Social Union of Bavaria.

See also
List of Bavarian Christian Social Union politicians

References

1904 births
1991 deaths
Bavaria Party politicians
Members of the Bundestag for Bavaria
Members of the Bundestag 1965–1969
Members of the Bundestag 1961–1965
Members of the Bundestag 1957–1961
Members of the Bundestag 1949–1953
Members of the Bundestag for the Christian Social Union in Bavaria